Syamsurizal (born 25 June 1955) is an Indonesian politician, who is currently serving as a member of the People's Representative Council since 2019, representing the Riau I electoral district. Syamsurizal is a member of the United Development Party, and is currently serving as Vice Chairman of the Second Commission.

Early life and education 
Syamsurizal was born on 25 June 1955, in Bengkalis regency, Riau. He attended elementary school at SDN I Bengkalis from 1967 until 1970. Subsequently, he attended junior highschool and then highschool at SMPN I Bengkalis (1970-1973) and SMA I Bengkalis (1973-1976), respectively. Following this, he graduated from the University of Riau with a bachelor's degree in Corporate Economics, before attaining a master's degree in Human Resources Management rom Padjadjaran University.

Political Career 
Employment history :

 Secretary of DPRD Prv. Riau, As: . Year: 2015 -
 Governor's Expert Staff, As: . Year 2014 -
 Pj. Mayor of Pekanbaru, As: . Year: 2011 - 2011
 Balitbang, As: Staff. Year: 2010 - 2010
 Prov. Inspectorate. Riau, As: Head. Year: 2010 - 2015
 Regent of Bengkalis, As: Regent. Year: 2005 - 2010
 Prov. Riau, As: Head. Year: 2000 - 2000
 Regent of Bengkalis, As: Regent. Year: 2000 - 2005
 Regional Secretariat of Finance Bureau of Riau Province, as: Head. Year: 1999 - 2000
 Dipenda Bengkalis, As: Head. Year: 1997 - 1999
 Bid, Planning Dipenda Prov, Riau, As: Head. Year: 1983 - 1996

References 

1955 births
Living people

Members of the People's Representative Council, 2019